Into Inception is the debut studio album by Swedish metalcore band Escape the Day. The album is their last with founding member Patrick Möhlenbrock, who had left the band prior to the release of the album. "Tear Down the Walls", "Derailed", "Tsunami", "Can You Hear Me", and "When Love Turns Around" can also be found in the 2014 Confessions EP, and got either re-recorded and remixed for Into Inception.

Track listing 
All tracks are written by Patrick Möhlenbrock, Sebastian Ekstrand, Sebastian Westman and Jonas Jenelin except where noted.

Personnel
 Sebastian Ekstrand - Vocals, Keys, Programming
 Jonas Jenelin - Scream Vocals
 Sebastian Westman - Guitars, Keys, Programming, Drums
 Patrick Möhlenbrock - Guitars, Keys, Programming
 Kristian Forsell - Bass

Production
Recorded at Los Angered Studios and Blueart Studios
Produced and Engineered by Sebastian Ekstrand, Patrick Möhlenbrock and Sebastian Westman
Mixed and Mastered by Sebastian Ekstrand
Artwork by Hugo Albonete and Sebastian Ekstrand

2016 albums
Escape the Day albums